Kim Bo-mi (Korean: 김보미; born July 27, 1990), better known by her stage name, KittiB (Korean: 키디비), is a South Korean rapper and songwriter. She was the first runner-up in TV music competition Unpretty Rapstar 2.

Career 
KittiB debuted in 2012 with the single, "I'm Her," which featured R&B singer Zion.T. In 2015, she appeared on TV rap competition Unpretty Rapstar 2, where she ultimately placed second overall. Following the show's finale, she signed a contract with hip hop label Brand New Music. In April 2016, she appeared as a producer on JTBC's rap competition show, Tribe of Hip Hop, which pairs rappers with non-rapper celebrities to teach them hip-hop.

Discography

Singles

As lead artist

As featured artist

Filmography

Variety show

References

External links

1990 births
Living people
People from Seoul
People from Siheung
South Korean women rappers
South Korean songwriters
South Korean television personalities
Brand New Music artists
Unpretty Rapstar contestants
21st-century South Korean women singers
21st-century South Korean singers